Ryszard Kaczorowski, GCMG (26 November 1919 – 10 April 2010) was a Polish statesman. From 1989 to 1990, he served as the last President of Poland-in-exile. He succeeded Kazimierz Sabbat, and resigned his post following Poland's regaining independence from the Soviet sphere of influence and the election of Lech Wałęsa as the first democratically elected President of Poland since before the Second World War. He died on 10 April 2010 in the plane crash near Smolensk, Russia, along with the President of Poland Lech Kaczyński and other senior government officials.

Life and career
Ryszard Kaczorowski was born on 26 November 1919, in a wooden house at 7 Mazowiecka Street in Piaski District of Białystok. The house stood at the intersection of Mazowiecka Street with the no longer existing Argentyńska Street., Białystok, Poland. His parents were Wacław Kaczorowski, of the Jelita Coat of Arms, and Jadwiga (née Sawicka). In 1920, when Białystok was overrun by Soviet forces during the Polish-Soviet War, it briefly served as headquarters of the Polish Revolutionary Committee headed by Julian Marchlewski, which attempted to declare the Polish Soviet Socialist Republic. The city again changed hands after the Battle of Białystok, when the city was liberated by the 1st Legions Infantry Division and 5th Legions' Infantry Regiment.  The family witnessed certain dramatic results of the battle from a small wooden house typical at Argentyńska Street.

He completed his education at a school of commerce. He was also a Scouting instructor of a local branch of the Polish Scouting Association. Following the Invasion of Poland at the beginning of World War II, he secretly recreated the scouting movement – which was banned by the Soviet authorities – and became a head of the Białystok banner of the Szare Szeregi. In 1940, he was arrested by the NKVD and sentenced to death, which was later changed to ten years in a concentration camp in Kolyma. He remembered later:On the third of May we organized a bonfire in the cell. And since we were on death row, we could not be punished any more, so the guard who opened the window and shouted "quieter!" he hit a clay bowl we had on hand. The bowl splattered, the guard hid, and we sang so that I think the whole prison heard.

Following the Sikorski-Mayski Agreement of 1941, he was set free and enlisted in Anders' Army. After its evacuation from the Soviet Union, Kaczorowski joined the 3rd Carpathian Rifle Division, where he completed divisional secondary school. He fought in most major battles of the Polish 2nd Corps, including the Battle of Monte Cassino. After the war, he remained in the United Kingdom as a political emigrant. Following demobilisation, he completed an academic course in foreign trade at the Polytechnic Regent Street (later the University of Westminster). Until 1986, he worked in business as an accountant. From 1955-67, he was the Chief Scout, and, subsequently, President of the émigré Polish Scouting Union (ZHP). As such, he led the Polish delegation for the 1957 Jamboree.

Kaczorowski was also active in Polish political circles and a member of the National Council of Poland, a parliament-in-exile. In 1986, he was appointed the Minister for Home Affairs within the Polish government in exile. As the April Constitution of Poland of 1935 (the legal basis for the government) allowed the president to appoint his successor "in case the seat is emptied before the peace is settled", acting president in exile Kazimierz Sabbat named Kaczorowski as his successor in January 1988. Sabbat died suddenly on 19 July 1989 and Kaczorowski automatically succeeded him. He handed over the insignia of the presidential power of the Second Republic to President Lech Wałęsa on 22 December 1990, signifying both a recognition of the legitimacy of the government in exile and its continuity with the Third Polish Republic.

Personal life

Ryszard Kaczorowski's last home was in London. He had two daughters with wife Karolina, Jadwiga Kaczorowska, who has two children Zenek and Wanda Szulc, and Alicja Jankowska who has three children, Ryszard, Marcin and Krystyna Jankowska. He was frequently present in Poland and was treated according to the Polish law on former presidents of the state, granting him a presidential pension, Biuro Ochrony Rządu protection and a chancellery. He was an honorary chairman of numerous social and historical organisations, as well as an honorary citizen of almost thirty cities in Poland, including: Warsaw, Gdańsk, Gdynia, Kielce, Kraków, Opole, Zielona Góra and his hometown of Białystok.

During his retirement, Kaczorowski did not hold any public positions, although it was reported that in November 1994 Prime Minister Waldemar Pawlak proposed to President Wałęsa to appoint Kaczorowski as Minister of Defence (as, under the then-constitution, the President appointed the Ministers of Defence, the Interior and Foreign Affairs, regardless of the Prime Minister's will). Although he was a self-described follower of Józef Piłsudski (Piłsudczyk), Kaczorowski chose to not get involved in any partisan or strictly political activity during his retirement.

On 9 November 2004, Kaczorowski was appointed to the Order of St Michael and St George as an Honorary Knight Grand Cross by Queen Elizabeth II of the United Kingdom for "his exceptional contribution to the community of Polish emigrees and their descendants living in the UK".

Death

He died on 10 April 2010 in a plane crash near Smolensk, Russia, along with the President of Poland Lech Kaczyński and 94 others. He was the oldest victim of the crash. On 19 April 2010, Kaczorowski's coffin was taken to St John's Cathedral for a funeral mass, before being buried in a crypt at the National Temple of Divine Providence in Warsaw.

Notes

References
 This article is copied in part from the website of the office of the President of the Republic of Poland, which allows free reproduction of its content; see .

External links

  Unofficial website

1919 births
2010 deaths
Foreign Gulag detainees
Honorary Knights Grand Cross of the Order of St Michael and St George
People from Białystok
Polish resistance members of World War II
Polish Scouts and Guides
State leaders killed in aviation accidents or incidents
Polish military personnel of World War II
Prisoners sentenced to death by the Soviet Union
Presidents of Poland
Polish emigrants to the United Kingdom
Recipients of the Order of Polonia Restituta
Recipients of the Pro Memoria Medal
Victims of the Smolensk air disaster
Polish deportees to Soviet Union
Polish people detained by the NKVD
Polish anti-communists
Accidental deaths in Russia
Recipients of the Order of the White Eagle (Poland)